Beyond the Border may refer to:

 Beyond the Border (1925 film), a 1925 silent film
 Beyond the Border (2011 film), a 2011 Swedish film
 Beyond the Border Storytelling Festival, based in Wales, UK